The following is a list of the municipal presidents of Sabinas Hidalgo, Nuevo León.

See also
Governor of Nuevo León

External links
 History  of Sabinas Hidalgo
 Official site  of the government of Sabinas Hidalgo (municipality)

sabinas